Modestus was a Roman cognomen. It may refer to:

 Julius Modestus (1st century BC), Roman freedman and grammarian
 Marcus Mettius Modestus (procurator) (1st century AD), Roman governor of Egypt
 Aufidius Modestus (1st century AD), Roman philologist, commentator on Horace
 Mettius Modestus, Roman consul AD 82
 Gaius Trebonius Proculus Mettius Modestus (2nd century), Roman senator
 Quintus Aiacius Modestus Crescentianus, consul alongside Marcus Pomponius Maecius Probus in 228
 Saint Modestus, legendary saint and educator of Saint Vitus, martyr under Diocletian (c. 304)
 Modestus, martyr at Agde alongside Saint Tiberius during the Diocletianic persecution
 Domitius Modestus (fl. 358–377), Roman politician
 Gaius Sollius Modestus Sidonius Apollinaris (5th century), Roman poet and diplomat
 Modestus (bishop of Trier) (died 489), saint
 Modestus of Jerusalem (died 630), Greek Orthodox patriarch of Jerusalem
 Modestus (Apostle of Carantania) (8th century), Irish missionary to the Carantanians and saint
 Modestus Yao Z. Ahiable (b. 1948), Ghanaian politician
 Modestus Kilufi (b. 1959), Tanzanian politician
 Modestus Fernando (b. 1963), Sri Lankan army colonel
 Modestus Setiawan (b. 1982), Indonesian footballer

See also 
 Modest (disambiguation)